The following is a timeline of the history of the city of Kazan, Tatarstan, Russia.

Prior to 20th century

 1438 - Khanate of Kazan begins.
 1486 - Kazan and the Russians sign a peace treaty.
 1552 - Siege of Kazan; Russians in power.
 1562 - Annunciation cathedral founded.
 1579 - Bogoroditski convent built.
 1708 - Kazan becomes the capital of the Kazan Governorate.
 1742 - The peak of persecution of the Muslims of Kazan by the Russians.
 1770 - Märcani Mosque built.
 1774
 July: Battle of Kazan (1774).
 Fire.
 1788 -  established near city.
 1804 - University founded.
 1815 - Fire.
 1825 - Fire.
 1849 - Nurulla Mosque built.
 1875 - Horse tramway begins operating.
 1881 - Population: 134,700.
 1883 - Population: 140,726.
 1890 - Äcem Mosque built.
 1894 - Moscow-Kazan Railway begins operating.
 1895 - Kazan Art School founded.
 1896 - Railway station built.
 1897 - Population: 131,508.
 1900 - Population: 143,707.

20th century
 1913 - Population: 195,300.
 1917
 14 August: 1917 Kazan Gunpowder Plant fire begins.
 12 December: Idel-Ural State declared.
 1918
 5–7 August: Capture of Kazan by the White Army.
 5–10 September: Red Army Kazan Operation occurs.
 1924 - Kazan Zoo founded.
 1965 - Population: 762,000.
 1973 -  formed.
 1985 - Population: 1,047,000.
 1986 - Kazan International Airport active.
 1989 - Kazan celebrates the 1100th anniversary of the conversion of Islam in the region.
 1990 - 8 August: Yeltsin gives speech ("as much sovereignty as you can swallow") in Kazan.
 1991 - Kamil Iskhakov becomes mayor.
 1992 - May:  meets in Kazan.
 1998 - Madina Mosque built.
 2000 - City becomes part of the Volga Federal District.

21st century
 2005
 Kazan Metro begins operating.
 Millennium Bridge (Kazan) and Qolşärif Mosque open.
 Medal "In Commemoration of the 1000th Anniversary of Kazan" created.
 Ilsur Metshin becomes mayor.
 2008 - 9 January: 2008 Kazan gas explosion.
 2013
 Kazan Arena opens.
 2013 Summer Universiade (athletic event) held in Kazan.
 2021
 11 May - Kazan school shooting

See also
 History of Kazan
 Other names of Kazan
 Timelines of other cities in the Volga Federal District of Russia: Nizhny Novgorod, Samara

References

This article incorporates information from the Russian Wikipedia.

Bibliography

External links

 Digital Public Library of America. Items related to Kazan, various dates

Kazan
Years in Russia